This is a list of notable immunologists.

Pioneers
Edward Jenner (1749-1823), discovered that cowpox induces protection against smallpox
Louis Pasteur (1822-1895), his experiments confirmed the germ theory of disease, he also created the first vaccine for rabies

Nobel laureates
1901 Emil Adolf von Behring (1854-1917), "for his serum therapy to treat diphtheria" (First ever Nobel Prize in Physiology or Medicine)
1908 Eli Metchnikoff (1845-1916) and Paul Ehrlich (1854-1915), "for study of the immune system"
1919 Jules Bordet (1870-1961), "for discovery of the complement system in the immune system"
1930 Karl Landsteiner (1868-1943), "for discovery of human blood types"
1960 Peter B. Medawar (1915-1987) and Frank Macfarlane Burnet (1899-1985), "for the discovery that the immune system of the fetus learns how to distinguish between self and non-self"
1972 Gerald Maurice Edelman (1929-2014) and Rodney Robert Porter (1917-1985), "for discovering the chemical structure of antibodies"
1980 Baruj Benacerraf (1920-2011), Jean Dausset (1916-2009) and George Davis Snell (1903-1996), "for discovery of the Major histocompatibility complex genes which encode cell surface molecules important for the immune system's distinction between self and non-self"
1984 Niels Jerne (1911-1994), Georges J. F. Köhler (1946-1995) and César Milstein (1927-2002), "for work on the immune system and the production of monoclonal antibodies"
1987 Susumu Tonegawa (1939-), "for discovering how the large diversity of antibodies is produced genetically"
1989 J. Michael Bishop (1936-) and Harold E. Varmus (1939-), "for discovering the cellular origins of retroviral oncogenes"
1996 Peter C. Doherty (1940-) and Rolf M. Zinkernagel (1944-), "for describing how MHC molecules are used by white blood cells to detect and kill virus-infected cells."
2011 Bruce Beutler (1957-), Jules A. Hoffmann (1941-), "for their discoveries concerning the activation of innate immunity" and Ralph Marvin Steinman (1943-2011)"for his discovery of the dendritic cell and its role in adaptive immunity"
2018 James P. Allison (1948-) and Tasuku Honjo (1942-), "for their discovery of cancer therapy by inhibition of negative immune regulation."

Notable immunologists

Vital Brazil  (1865–1950)
Alan Aderem, innate immunity
Lorne Babiuk (1946-)
Mike Belosevic (1951-)
Kiril Bratanov (1911-1986), pioneer in the area of immunology of reproduction
William Coley (1862-1936), pioneer of cancer immunotherapy
Albert Coons (1912-1978), developed immunofluorescent techniques for labelling antibodies
Max D. Cooper (1933-), identification of T and B cells
 Yehuda Danon (1940-)
Deborah Doniach (1912-2004), organ-specific auto-immunity
Eva Engvall (1940-), one of the scientists who invented ELISA in 1971.
Anthony Fauci (1940-)
Denise Faustman (1958-), Type 1 diabetes 
William Frankland (1912-2020), popularisation of the UK pollen count, and prediction of increased penicillin allergy
Ian Frazer (1953-), development of a cervical cancer vaccine 
Samuel O. Freedman (1928-), discovered Carcinoembryonic antigen 
Jules T. Freund (1890-1960)
Sankar Ghosh
John Grange (1943-2016)
Waldemar Haffkine (1860-1930), first microbiologist who developed and used vaccines against cholera and bubonic plague.
Michael Heidelberger (1888-1991), showed that antibodies are proteins
George Heist (1886-1920)
Leonard Herzenberg (1931-2013)
Miroslav Holub (1923-1998) 
Charles Janeway (1943-2003), wrote the standard textbook Immunobiology
Dermot Kelleher
Tadamitsu Kishimoto (1939-)
Jan Klein (1936-), Mhc
Mary Loveless (1899-1991), insect venom allergy
Tak Wah Mak (1946-), discovery of the T-cell receptor
Alberto Mantovani
Polly Matzinger (1947-), immunological tolerance, Danger Model, Hyppo Model
Ira Mellman
Jacques Miller (1931-)
Avrion Mitchison (1928-)
Michael Neuberger (1953-2013)
Evelyn Nicol (1930-2020)
Alan Munro (1937-)
Gustav Nossal (1931-)
Santa J. Ono (1962-)
Thomas Platts-Mills (1941-), discovered dust-mite allergen and alpha-gal allergy from tick bites 
Nicholas P. Restifo (1960-) 
Ivan Roitt (1927-)
Jon van Rood (1926-2017), pioneer in the field of HLA and immunogenetics of transplantation, the founder of the international organ exchange organization Eurotransplant
Mario Rosemblatt (1941-), who established that dendritic cells are responsible for imprinting the tissue-specific homing of T lymphocytes
Fred Rosen (1930-2005), discovered the cause of X-linked hyper IgM syndrome
Shimon Sakaguchi (1948-), discovery of regulatory T cells
Louis W. Sauer (1885-1980), perfected pertussis vaccine, developed diphtheria/p daertussis/tetanus vaccine
Emil Skamene (1941-)
David Talmage (1919-2014), clonal selection theory
James S. Tan (1927-2006)
Reyes Tamez (1952-)
Kevin J. Tracey (1957-)
Jan Vilcek (1933-)
Ellen Vitetta
Alexander S. Wiener (1907-1976)
Don Wiley (1944-2001), crystallography of HLA proteins
Ian Wilson (biologist)
Ernst Witebsky (1901-1969), isolation and partial characterization of A and B blood antigens
Jian Zhou (1957-1999), with co-inventor Ian Frazer has priority for invention of Virus-like particle and HPV vaccine

Immunologists in popular culture
Allison Cameron, character on the television series House M.D.

References

 
Immunologists